A factor endowment, in economics, is commonly understood to be the amount of land, labor, capital, and entrepreneurship that a country possesses and can exploit for manufacturing. Countries with a large endowment of resources tend to be more prosperous than those with a small endowment if all other things are equal. The development of sound institutions to access and equitably distribute these resources, however, is necessary in order for a country to obtain the greatest benefit from its factor endowment.

See also
 Environmental determinism
 Resource curse

References

Factors of production